The Long steam tricycle appears to be one of the earliest preserved examples of a steam tricycle, built by George A. Long around 1880 and patented in 1883.  One example was built, which after some years of use was dismantled and the parts dispersed.  In 1946, one John H. Bateman, with assistance from the 96-year-old Long, reassembled the machine, which is now on display at the Smithsonian Institution. The example at the Smithsonian has been noted as the "oldest completely operable self-propelled road vehicle in the museum".

In 2004–2010, the item was displayed at Blackhawk Museum in northern California.

Specifications
Specifications in the infobox to the right are from the Smithsonian Institution America on the Move collection.

Steering the two front wheels was accomplished via two independent tillers which would have made simultaneous steering and control of the brake levers difficult for a single individual.

See also
List of motorized trikes
List of motorcycles of the 1890s
History of steam road vehicles
 Steam engine

References

Further reading

External links

Stamp bearing an image of the Long steam tricycle from Burkina Faso post, c. 1985
Smithsonian - Race to the Museum: Long steam tricycle, about 1880

Artifacts in the collection of the Smithsonian Institution
Steam tricycles
19th-century motorcycles
Motorcycles of the United States